Baby Snakes is the soundtrack to Frank Zappa's film of the same name. It features seven songs from the film.

Overview
The track "Baby Snakes" is the studio recording which appears on Sheik Yerbouti, but omits the opening riff (instead starting at the first verse). All other tracks are live recordings, unique to this album and the film.

Like the Shut Up 'n Play Yer Guitar set, this LP was originally offered for sale only as a mail order item through Columbia Records' Record Club division in Terre Haute, IN. The LP was later offered to distributors for conventional brick-and-mortar store sales.

Baby Snakes: The Compleat Soundtrack was released to iTunes on December 21, 2012.

Track listing

AAAFNRAA: Baby Snakes – The Compleat Soundtrack

AAAFNRAA Baby Snakes: The Compleat Soundtrack is the complete soundtrack, released to iTunes on Zappa's birthday on December 21, 2012.  Of the official releases, it is the only release which is available only as a download.

Its tracks are:

Credits 
 Frank Zappa – director, keyboards, vocals, guitar
 Adrian Belew – vocals, guitar
 Tommy Mars – keyboards, vocals
 Peter Wolf – keyboards
 Patrick O'Hearn – bass guitar
 Terry Bozzio – drums, vocals on "Titties & Beer" and "Punky's Whips"
 Ed Mann – percussion

Production 
 Arranged & Produced by Frank Zappa
 Engineered & Mixed by Joe Chiccarelli
 Mastered by Bob Stone
 Norman Seeff – photography
 Lynn Goldsmith – photography

References 

1983 soundtrack albums
Albums produced by Frank Zappa
Barking Pumpkin Records albums
Film soundtracks
Frank Zappa albums
Albums recorded at the Palladium (New York City)